Mario Arturo Alegría Pastor is a Peruvian politician and a Congressman representing the La Libertad for the 2006–2011 term. Alegría belongs to the Peruvian Aprista Party.

External links
Official Congressional Site

Living people
21st-century Peruvian politicians
Members of the Congress of the Republic of Peru
American Popular Revolutionary Alliance politicians
Year of birth missing (living people)
Place of birth missing (living people)